Stephen Root (born November 17, 1951) is an American actor. He has starred as Jimmy James on the television sitcom NewsRadio, as Milton Waddams in the film Office Space (1999), and provided the voices of Bill Dauterive and Buck Strickland on the animated series King of the Hill (1997–2010). His other roles have included Capt. K'Vada in the Star Trek: The Next Generation two-part episode "Unification" (1991), several roles in Coen Brothers films including Mr. Lund in O Brother, Where Art Thou? (2000), Gordon Pibb in DodgeBall (2004), Hawthorne Abendsen in seasons 2–4 of the series The Man in the High Castle, Jim Hudson in Get Out (2017), and supporting roles in a variety of HBO series, including Boardwalk Empire, True Blood, Perry Mason, and Succession. He currently stars as Monroe Fuches / The Raven on the HBO dark comedy series Barry (2018–present), for which he was nominated for a Primetime Emmy Award for Outstanding Supporting Actor in a Comedy Series in 2019.

Early life
Root was born in Sarasota, Florida, the son of Leona Estelle and Rolland Clair Root, a project superintendent and site manager on major civil engineering projects throughout the United States and Mexico. Root has likened his childhood to that of an "Army brat", as his family frequently relocated while his father finished each construction project. Root graduated from Vero Beach High School in Vero Beach, Florida. He received his Associate of Arts degree from the University of Florida and trained in the Bachelor in Fine Arts acting program. The university recognized him as one of its distinguished alumni in 2008. Subsequently he was granted his BFA after completion of his final semester based on the quality and character of his acting career, having left college to pursue Broadway in his final semester.

Career 
Root began his career on stage in 1986. He made his Broadway acting debut in the play So Long on Lonely Street, where he played King Vaughnum III. He also appeared in All My Sons as Frank Lubey, and as Jon in the 2015 play Marjorie Prime.

Root made his feature film debut in the 1988 film Crocodile Dundee II as a DEA agent. That same year, he acted in the psychological horror film Monkey Shines as Dean Burbage. He had a brief cameo in the 1990 movie Ghost. Among his most recognized television roles are eccentric billionaire Jimmy James on the sitcom NewsRadio and in a recurring role on the final two seasons of The West Wing as Republican campaign consultant Bob Mayer. He appeared in many memorable comedy films, including as the mumbling, quirky Milton Waddams in Office Space; the mild-mannered gym rat Gordon Pibb in Dodgeball: A True Underdog Story; Suds, a drunk sportswriter, in Leatherheads; and the dimwitted principal in the 2008 Judd Apatow-produced comedy Drillbit Taylor.

Root is a favorite of the Coen brothers. He has appeared in O Brother, Where Art Thou?, The Ladykillers, No Country for Old Men, and The Ballad of Buster Scruggs. Kevin Smith wrote a role in Jersey Girl specifically for Root.

Root reunited with Mike Judge in Idiocracy and has also portrayed NASA flight director Chris Kraft in the miniseries From the Earth to the Moon. He took on the biographical role of Richard A. Clarke in The Path to 9/11. He has also had many guest appearances in television programs across several genres. He was Klingon Captain K'Vada in the Star Trek: The Next Generation episode "Unification" in 1991. In 1992, Root appeared on the TV series Night Court as Mr. Willard. In the 1993–1994 television season, Root appeared as a series regular as "R.O." on the Beau Bridges/Lloyd Bridges comedy/western series Harts of the West on CBS.

Root guest-starred on Seinfeld as a bank manager in the episode "The Invitations", handling Kramer's hello greeting issue. He had a role in Frasier in the episode "Detour" as the father of the family helping Frasier when his car broke down. In the CSI episode "Homebodies" he played the father of a rape victim. He also had a regular role on the short-lived CBS series Ladies Man, which starred Sharon Lawrence soon after she left NYPD Blue. He played Raymond, a hunting store owner involved in illegal gun trading, in the 1993 In the Heat of the Night episode "A Love Lost."

He also has an active career as a voice actor, most notably as the voice of divorced, down-and-out Army barber Bill Dauterive, Hank Hill's hedonistic boss Buck Strickland and various other characters on the Fox animated television series King of the Hill. He is also heard in animated films such as Ice Age, Finding Nemo, and Rango. In other animated television series, his regular roles include Commander Chode in Tripping the Rift and Homebase in The X's. He has also provided vocal talent in animated television series like Chowder and Teen Titans. He recently lent his voice to Batman: The Brave and the Bold as Woozy Winks and The Penguin.

Root has appeared in HBO's series True Blood as a vampire named Eddie. He had a multi-episode arc in the second season of Pushing Daisies on ABC, playing the mysterious Dwight Dixon. He appeared as Johnny Forreals, inventor of the word "boo-yah," on an episode of Comedy Central's The Sarah Silverman Program entitled "Cangamangus". He appeared in the 2009 comedy film The Men Who Stare at Goats as Gus Lacey. In 2010, he appeared in a multi-episode arc in season 8 of the Fox television series 24 as a probation officer named Bill Prady and in the FX television series Justified as the eccentric Judge Mike "The Hammer" Reardon. In 2011, he appeared in Robert Redford's The Conspirator, playing John Lloyd, a key witness in the trial of alleged Lincoln conspirator Mary Surratt. In 2012, he began playing the role of Gaston Means in season 3 of the acclaimed HBO TV series Boardwalk Empire. He also portrays Lynn Boyle, father of Charles Boyle on the show Brooklyn Nine-Nine. In 2018, Root began starring in the HBO series Barry, for which he received a Primetime Emmy Award nomination.

Personal life
Root married his first wife Laura Joan Hase in 1984, with whom he had a son, Cody. They divorced in August 1997. He married actress Romy Rosemont on December 14, 2008. They co-starred together in several television shows such as Fringe and Masters of Sex. They were due to appear on-screen together in the 2011 horror film Red State, but Rosemont was forced to pull out due to a scheduling conflict with Glee.

Filmography

Film

Television

Video games

Theme parks

Web

Theatre

References

External links

 
 
 

1951 births
20th-century American male actors
21st-century American male actors
Actors from Sarasota, Florida
American male film actors
American male television actors
American male video game actors
American male voice actors
Living people
Male actors from Florida
University of Florida alumni
Vero Beach High School alumni